The singles final of the Stanford Classic was held on August 6, 2017. Johanna Konta was the defending champion, but chose not to participate this year. Madison Keys won the title, defeating CoCo Vandeweghe in the final, 7–6(7–4), 6–4.

Seeds 
The top four seeds received a bye into the second round.

Draw

Finals

Top half

Bottom half

Qualifying

Seeds

Qualifiers

Draw

First qualifier

Second qualifier

Third qualifier

Fourth qualifier

External links
 Main draw
 Qualifying draw

2017 US Open Series
2017 WTA Tour
2017 Singles